The Venugopalaswamy Temple, dedicated to a form of the Hindu god Vishnu is located inside the Devanahalli Fort in the town of Devanahalli (also called Devanapura). It is a town in the Bangalore Rural district, Karnataka state, India and is located 35 kilometres (25 mi) to the north-east of Bangalore, the state capital. The Venugopalaswamy temple is constructed in the Dravidian style and belongs to the post Vijayanagara empire period. The temple is a protected monument under the Karnataka state division of the Archaeological Survey of India.

Gallery

References

Vishnu temples
Hindu temples in Bangalore Rural district
Vijayanagara Empire